Juvigny may refer to the following places in France:

 Juvigny, Aisne, in the Aisne département 
 Juvigny, Marne, in the Marne département
 Juvigny, Haute-Savoie, in the Haute-Savoie département 
 Juvigny-en-Perthois, in the Meuse département
 Juvigny-le-Tertre, in the Manche département 
 Juvigny-sous-Andaine, in the Orne département
 Juvigny-sur-Loison, in the Meuse département 
 Juvigny-sur-Orne, in the Orne département
 Juvigny-sur-Seulles, in the Calvados département